Christine Sinclair is a professional soccer player who has played as a striker for the Canada women's national soccer team since 2000. , her 190 goals in 322 matches ranks first in most career international goals scored by a female or male soccer player worldwide ahead of Abby Wambach's 184 goals. She surpassed Mia Hamm for the number two spot in February 2016. The all-time leading goal scorer and most-capped player of the Canadian national team, Sinclair is also the captain of the team.

Sinclair made her debut for the senior team at age 16 at the 2000 Algarve Cup where she was the tournament's leading scorer with three goals. She scored seven goals for Canada at the 2002 CONCACAF Women's Gold Cup, which tied for the tournament's lead. Her three goals at the 2003 FIFA Women's World Cup helped lead Canada to the team's first fourth-place finish (a team best at the time since the inaugural 1991 FIFA Women's World Cup).

At the 2012 London Olympics, Sinclair broke the record of most goals scored in Olympic women's soccer and was awarded the Golden Boot after scoring two goals against South Africa, one against Great Britain, and a hat-trick against the United States in the semifinal. Her performance earned her the honour of Canada's flag bearer in the closing ceremony as well as the Queen Elizabeth II Diamond Jubilee Medal.

International goals

Statistics

See also

 List of women's footballers with 100 or more international goals
 List of footballers with 100 or more caps
 List of women's Olympic football tournament records

References

Canada women's national soccer team
Sinclair goals
Women's association football records and statistics
Sinclair goals